Yakupov is a Russian/Tatar masculine surname, its feminine counterpart is Yakupova. It may refer to
Nail Yakupov (born 1993), Russian ice hockey right winger 
Ilmir Yakupov (born 1994), Russian football player
Valiulla Yakupov (1963–2012), Muslim cleric in Tatarstan

Russian-language surnames
Patronymic surnames
Surnames from given names